Ladder to the Moon is a United Kingdom-based social enterprise that works with healthcare organisations to enhance the quality of residential care for those living with dementia and old age, through the use of creativity, coaching, training and consultancy.

History 
The organisation has its headquarters in London and was established in 2002. It was established as a charity, but in 2013 it became a registered Community Interest Company in England and Wales, company number 8417544. It has been supported by British Department of Health Innovation and Social Enterprise funds and was a finalist at the National Dementia Care Awards in 2011. Ladder to the Moon's Managing Director, Chris Gage, was named Care Innovator of the Year (Greater London) in the 2013 Great British Care Awards.

Ladder to the Moon was also one of the founder members of the National Skills Academy for Social Care.

See also
 Caregiving and dementia
 Dementia
 Elderly care
 Relationship Theatre

External links
 Official Site
 National Skills Academy for Social Care 
 Ladder to the Moon Entertainment, Registered Charity no. 1094968 at the Charity Commission
 National Dementia Care Awards
 Great British Care Awards 2013
 Clearly So Social Enterprise Directory

Charities for disabled people based in the United Kingdom
Organizations established in 2002
2002 establishments in the United Kingdom